Macroglossum prometheus is a moth of the  family Sphingidae.

Distribution 
It is known from south-east Asia and Queensland.

Description 
The wingspan is about 50 mm. There is a prominent, subapical, costal, grey patch on the forewing and a sharply defined distal border on the hindwing. Both wing undersides are brown, shaded with khaki, the yellow anal area contrasts sharply. The hindwing upperside has a yellow band which is very sharply defined.

Subspecies
Macroglossum prometheus prometheus
Macroglossum prometheus lineata Lucas, 1891 (Australia)

References

Macroglossum
Moths described in 1875